Hapana verticalis is a species of moth of the family Thyrididae. It is found in Nigeria, Cameroon, Angola, Namibia, Sierra Leone, Ivory Coast, Ghana, Democratic Republic of the Congo, Uganda, Sudan, Gabon, Kenya, Zimbabwe, Mozambique, South Africa and Tanzania.

They have a wing length between 7.5 and 9.5 mm. Externally this species is very similar to Hapana carcealis. The male can be distinguished by the large reddish patch at the hindwings of H. carcealis and the genitalia are different.

References

Thyrididae
Lepidoptera of Angola
Lepidoptera of the Democratic Republic of the Congo
Lepidoptera of Kenya
Lepidoptera of Mozambique
Lepidoptera of South Africa
Lepidoptera of Sudan
Lepidoptera of Tanzania
Lepidoptera of Uganda
Lepidoptera of West Africa
Lepidoptera of Zambia
Moths of Sub-Saharan Africa
Moths described in 1899